Walter Hogg (February 17, 1889 – September 19, 1949) was a Canadian politician. He served in the Legislative Assembly of British Columbia from 1948 to 1949  from the electoral district of Cariboo, a member of the Coalition government.

References

1889 births
1949 deaths